Íngrid Sander (born 12 March 1937) is a Venezuelan fencer. She competed in the women's individual and team foil events at the 1960 Summer Olympics.

References

External links
 

1937 births
Living people
Venezuelan female foil fencers
Olympic fencers of Venezuela
Fencers at the 1960 Summer Olympics
People from Caracas
Pan American Games medalists in fencing
Pan American Games bronze medalists for Venezuela
Fencers at the 1959 Pan American Games
20th-century Venezuelan women
21st-century Venezuelan women